"Unwell" is a song by American alternative rock group Matchbox Twenty. Released on February 3, 2003, as the second single from their third album, More Than You Think You Are (2002), it was written by Matchbox Twenty lead singer Rob Thomas. "Unwell" spent 18 weeks atop the US Billboard Adult Top 40 chart and two weeks atop the Billboard Hot Adult Contemporary Tracks chart. It also reached  5 on the Billboard Hot 100, becoming their third and final top-10 hit. Internationally, the single became a top-20 hit in Australia, peaking at number 12, and a top-10 hit in New Zealand, peaking at number eight. "Unwell" was nominated for a Grammy Award in 2004 for Best Pop Performance by a Duo or Group with Vocal.

Content
On the live DVD Show: A Night in the Life of Matchbox Twenty, Rob Thomas states that he wrote the song as a metaphor for humanity in general, a song for people who are "messed up and feel alone like that. We all feel a little messed up sometimes... you're not alone."

Reception
The song was the second most-played song in the United States in 2003 according to Billboard magazine. The music video was No. 1 on VH1's Top 40 Videos of 2003. In 2011, VH1 named the song as the 82nd best song of the 2000s.

Music video
Directed by Meiert Avis, the music video predominantly features lead singer Rob Thomas seeing various odd occurrences throughout, all the while singing along to the song. The other band members only appear in cameos, notably when Thomas boards a subway and they are seen in the background. The appearance of the other band mates is also altered like most of the video (their noses are rather large). The other band members are also seen at the end of the video gathered in Thomas' room, and each takes their turn waving goodbye to the camera before Thomas does so as well at the end of the video. One of the reasons Thomas picked Avis to direct is because his concept for the video was the closest thing to an acid trip out of every other idea.

Track listing
German and Australian CD single
 "Unwell" (Avid Rough Cut 1) – 3:55
 "All I Need" (live) – 3:41
 "Unwell" (live acoustic) – 4:12

Charts

Weekly charts

Year-end charts

Decade-end charts

All-time charts

Certifications

Release history

See also
 List of Billboard Adult Contemporary number ones of 2003
 Used to Be, a 2021 single by American DJ Steve Aoki, American singer Kiiara, and featuring American rapper Wiz Khalifa, which interpolates the chorus lyrics for its own chorus

References

2002 songs
2003 singles
Atlantic Records singles
Matchbox Twenty songs
Music videos directed by Meiert Avis
Song recordings produced by Matt Serletic
Songs about depression
Songs about mental health
Songs written by Rob Thomas (musician)